Antonis Kablionis (born 24 October 1991) is a Greek professional footballer who plays both as a defender and a winger.

Career 
He began his career in Germany in 2008, from the youth team of FSV Erlangen-Bruck, and in 2009 he played for the youth team of SSV Jahn Regensburg in the Under 19 Bundesliga. He competed in 24 games and scored 1 goal. He then moved on and continued his career at Freier TuS Regensburg in the Bayernliga. In the summer of 2011, he signed with the Greek Football League club AO Chania. He competed with the Cretan club for almost 3 years and in August 2014, he signed for A.O. Trikala in the Greek Gamma Ethniki. On 27 August 2015 he signed with AE Larissa. On 1 February 2016 Kablionis was given on loan to Gamma Ethniki club Pydna Kitros until the end of the season.

References

External links
goaltrikala.gr

dokari.gr

1991 births
Living people
Greek expatriate footballers
AEL Limassol players
GAS Ialysos 1948 F.C. players
Trikala F.C. players
Association football defenders
Association football forwards
Footballers from Athens
Greek footballers